beta-Fuoxymorphamine (β-fuoxymorphamine) is an opioid acting at μ-opioid receptors. It is used experimentally.

See also 
 beta-Funaltrexamine

References 

Opioids
Heterocyclic compounds with 5 rings
Oxygen heterocycles
Nitrogen heterocycles
Amides
Methyl esters
Fumarate esters